Jacob Zhimomi is a Bharatiya Janata Party politician from Nagaland. He has been consecutively elected in the Nagaland Legislative Assembly election from Ghaspani I since 2013. He is currently serving as the Minister of Public Health Engineering and Cooperation/Government Of Nagaland in the Fifth Neiphiu Rio ministry (2023). Jacob Zhimomi is the son of Ihezhe Zhimomi, a native of Aghunato Sub-division of Zünheboto District, who was a former Politician/Member of the First Nagaland Legislative Assembly.

References 

Living people
Bharatiya Janata Party politicians from Nagaland
Nagaland MLAs 2018–2023
Nagaland MLAs 2013–2018
Year of birth missing (living people)
People from Dimapur